Aristofusus benjamini is a species of sea snail, a marine gastropod mollusk in the family Fasciolariidae, the spindle snails, the tulip snails and their allies.

Description

Distribution
This marine species occurs in the Caribbean Sea off Barbados.

References

 Hadorn R. (1997). Fusinus benjamini n. sp. (Gastropoda: Fasciolariidae). La Conchiglia. 29(282): 10-15
 Vermeij G.J. & Snyder M.A. (2018). Proposed genus-level classification of large species of Fusininae (Gastropoda, Fasciolariidae). Basteria. 82(4-6): 57-82

External links
 Lyons W.G. & Snyder M.A. (2019). Fasciolariidae (Gastropoda: Neogastropoda) of French Guiana and nearby regions, with descriptions of two new species and comments on marine zoogeography of northeastern South America. Zootaxa. 4585(2): 239-268.

benjamini
Gastropods described in 1997